James McCready (1816–1909) was the fourth mayor of the city of Indianapolis, Indiana, and the first Democrat to hold that office. As mayor, McCready appointed the city's first police force.

References

1816 births
1854 deaths
Mayors of Indianapolis
Indiana Democrats
19th-century American politicians